Thelxinoe , also known as , is a natural satellite of Jupiter. It was discovered by a team of astronomers from the University of Hawaii led by Scott S. Sheppard in 2004 from pictures taken in 2003, and originally received the temporary designation .

Thelxinoe is about 2 kilometres in diameter, and orbits Jupiter at an average distance of 20,454 Mm in 597.607 days, at an inclination of 151° to the ecliptic (153° to Jupiter's equator), in a retrograde direction and with an eccentricity of 0.2685.

It was named in March 2005 after Thelxinoe, one of the four original Muses according to some Greek writers, and a daughter of Zeus (Jupiter) by Mnemosyne.

Thelxinoe belongs to the Ananke group, retrograde irregular moons that orbit Jupiter between 19.3 and 22.7 Gm, at inclinations of roughly 150°.

References

Ananke group
Moons of Jupiter
Irregular satellites
Discoveries by Scott S. Sheppard
Astronomical objects discovered in 2004
Moons with a retrograde orbit